Tony Fields II (born June 18, 1999) is an American football linebacker for the Cleveland Browns of the National Football League (NFL). He played college football at Arizona and West Virignia.

Early years
Fields attended Desert Pines High School in Las Vegas. He committed to Arizona University to play football.

His mother LeMisha Fields is 1/3rd of the R&B trio “702”. His maternal aunt Irish Grinstead also made up 1/3 of the final line-up of the group. When he was conceived, his mothers now deceased sister Orish (who was a member of the original quartet line-up and also Irish’s twin) filled in for LeMisha for a few months until her maternity leave return.

College career
As a three-year starter at Arizona, Fields primarily played Outside Linebacker. Following his year, Fields decided to transfer to West Virginia University, wanting to prove his versatility to NFL Scouts. After a successful senior season, Fields declared for the 2021 NFL Draft.

Professional career

On May 1, 2021, Fields was selected by the Cleveland Browns with the 153rd overall pick in the 2021 NFL Draft. He signed his four-year rookie contract on May 13, 2021.

References

External links

Living people
Sportspeople from Las Vegas
Players of American football from Nevada
American football linebackers
Arizona Wildcats football players
West Virginia Mountaineers football players
Cleveland Browns players
1999 births